Ricardo Alves Fernandes (born November 6, 1982), also known as Ricardinho, is a Brazilian former footballer. He played in several teams in Brazil, the Middle East, Asia and Europe.

Career
On March 4, 2005 Ricardinho made his debut for Vasco da Gama coming on for Diego Pereira Corrêa in the 11th minute in the team's 1–0 defeat against Volta Redonda in the Campeonato Carioca. Ricardinho made his first assist for Vasco da Gama with a cross to Romario in the 2x2 tied against rivals Flamengo in the Maracanã on March 20, 2005.

On July 20, 2008, the Egyptian club Zamalek signed contract with Ricardo Alves Fernandes for three seasons in a $1,000,000 contract.

On February 4, 2012, Ricardinho scored in the 60th minute, on his debut for Navibank Sài Gòn F.C. on a 2x0 win against Hoang Anh Gia Lai FC in the V.League 1.

In 2016, Ricardinho started the Academy business and Event Production Company. He owns BIFA Academy and Top The Line

Personal life
On January 19, 2009, Ricardinho terminated his employment contract, and subsequently lodged a claim in front of FIFA against the Club seeking, USD $1,223,566 as compensation for breach of contract. On December 4, 2017 Zamalek was fined by FIFA to pay Ricardinho for breach of contract and late outstanding dues.

References

External links

1982 births
Living people
Brazilian footballers
Expatriate footballers in Thailand
Association football defenders
Expatriate footballers in Libya
Zamalek SC players
Egyptian Premier League players